China Gate is an album by Cul de Sac, released in 1996. The album incorporated elements of surf rock.

Critical reception
Trouser Press wrote that "[Jon] Proudman is an extremely musical drummer who can hold down the fort while taking off on flights of fancy with the liquidly propulsive [Chris] Fujiwara." Rolling Stone praised "the deft, pointillist strokes with which guitarist Glenn Jones dots the margins of his spare compositions."

Paste listed the album as one of the "50 Best Post-Rock Albums", writing that it "set the bar for the group's expansive experimentalism, allowing them to work Can-like rhythms, Eastern-influenced melodies, flickering electronics, and plenty of noise into their deconstructions of the rock idiom."

Track listing

Personnel 
Cul de Sac
Robin Amos – synthesizers, sampler, vocals
Chris Fujiwara – bass guitar
Glenn Jones – guitar
Jon Proudman – drums, vocals
Production and additional personnel
Cul de Sac – production
Nancy Given – design
Bill Salkin – engineering
Walter Stickle – engineering
Jon Williams – production, engineering

References

External links 
 

1996 albums
Cul de Sac (band) albums
Thirsty Ear Recordings albums